This is a list of games made on the CD-i format, organised alphabetically by name. It includes cancelled games as well as actual releases. There are currently  games on this list. See Lists of video games for related lists.

Games

Multimedia

Unreleased

Homebrew

References

CD-i
Philips products